Cyclopogon is a genus of flowering plants from the orchid family, Orchidaceae. It is a fairly large genus distributed widely over much of South America, the Galápagos, Central America, Mexico and the West Indies, with 2 species (C. elatus  + C. cranichoides) in southern Florida.

Species

 Cyclopogon adhaesus Szlach.
 Cyclopogon alexandrae (Kraenzl.) Schltr.
 Cyclopogon aphyllus Schltr.
 Cyclopogon apricus (Lindl.) Schltr.
 Cyclopogon argyrifolius (Barb.Rodr.) Barb.Rodr.
 Cyclopogon argyrotaenius Schltr.
 Cyclopogon bangii (Rolfe ex Rusby) Schltr.
 Cyclopogon bicolor (Ker Gawl.) Schltr.
 Cyclopogon bidentatus (Barb.Rodr.) Szlach.
 Cyclopogon calophyllus (Barb.Rodr.) Barb.Rodr.
 Cyclopogon casanaensis Schltr.
 Cyclopogon cearensis Barb.Rodr.
 Cyclopogon comosus (Rchb.f.) Burns-Bal. & E.W.Greenw.
 Cyclopogon condoranus Dodson
 Cyclopogon congestus (Vell.) Hoehne
 Cyclopogon cranichoides (Griseb.) Schltr.
 Cyclopogon deminkiorum Burns-Bal. & M.S.Foster
 Cyclopogon dressleri Szlach.
 Cyclopogon dusenii Schltr.
 Cyclopogon dutrae  Schltr.
 Cyclopogon elatus (Sw.) Schltr.
 Cyclopogon eldorado (Linden & Rchb.f.) Schltr.
 Cyclopogon elegans Hoehne
 Cyclopogon ellipticus (Garay) Dodson
 Cyclopogon epiphyticus (Dodson) Dodson
 Cyclopogon estradae Dodson
 Cyclopogon eugenii (Rchb.f. & Warm.) Schltr.
 Cyclopogon gardneri Mytnik, Szlach. & Rutk.
 Cyclopogon glabrescens (T.Hashim.) Dodson, Brako & Zarucchi
 Cyclopogon goodyeroides (Schltr.) Schltr.
 Cyclopogon gracilis Schltr.
 Cyclopogon graciliscapus Schltr.
 Cyclopogon hatschbachii Schltr.
 Cyclopogon hennisianus (Sandt) Szlach.
 Cyclopogon hirtzii Dodson
 Cyclopogon iguapensis Schltr.
 Cyclopogon inaequilaterus (Poepp. & Endl.) Schltr.
 Cyclopogon itatiaiensis (Kraenzl.) Hoehne
 Cyclopogon laxiflorus Ekman & Mansf.
 Cyclopogon lindleyanus (Link, Klotzsch & Otto) Schltr.
 Cyclopogon longibracteatus (Barb.Rodr.) Schltr.
 Cyclopogon luerorum Dodson
 Cyclopogon luteoalbus (A.Rich. & Galeotti) Schltr.
 Cyclopogon macer Schltr.
 Cyclopogon maldonadoanus Dodson
 Cyclopogon millei (Schltr.) Schltr.
 Cyclopogon miradorensis Schltr.
 Cyclopogon monophyllus (Lindl.) Schltr.
 Cyclopogon multiflorus Schltr.
 Cyclopogon obliquus (J.J.Sm.) Szlach.
 Cyclopogon oliganthus (Hoehne) Hoehne & Schltr.
 Cyclopogon olivaceus (Rolfe) Schltr.
 Cyclopogon ovalifolius C.Presl
 Cyclopogon paludosus (Cogn.) Schltr.
 Cyclopogon papilio Szlach.
 Cyclopogon pelagalloanus Dodson
 Cyclopogon peruvianus (C.Presl) Schltr.
 Cyclopogon plantagineus Schltr.
 Cyclopogon prasophylloides (Garay) Szlach.
 Cyclopogon prasophyllus (Rchb.f.) Schltr.
 Cyclopogon pringlei (S.Watson) Soto Arenas
 Cyclopogon proboscideus Szlach.
 Cyclopogon pululahuanus Dodson
 Cyclopogon rimbachii Schltr.
 Cyclopogon rotundifolius (Cogn.) Schltr.
 Cyclopogon saccatus (A.Rich. & Galeotti) Schltr.
 Cyclopogon sillarensis Dodson & R.Vásquez
 Cyclopogon stenoglossus Pabst
 Cyclopogon subalpestris Schltr.
 Cyclopogon tandapianus Dodson
 Cyclopogon taquaremboensis (Barb.Rodr.) Schltr.
 Cyclopogon torusus Mytnik, Szlach. & Rutk.
 Cyclopogon trifasciatus Schltr.
 Cyclopogon truncatus (Lindl.) Schltr.
 Cyclopogon variegatus Barb.Rodr.
 Cyclopogon venustus (Barb.Rodr.) Schltr.
 Cyclopogon vittatus Dutra ex Pabst
 Cyclopogon warmingii (Rchb.f.) Schltr.
 Cyclopogon werffii Dodson
 Cyclopogon williamsii Dodson & R.Vásquez

See also
List of Orchidaceae genera

References

External links

Cranichideae genera
Spiranthinae